Rudolph Bergh (15 October 1824 – 20 July 1909), full name Ludvig Sophus Rudolph Bergh, was a Danish physician and malacologist. He worked in Copenhagen.

As a doctor his speciality was sexually transmitted diseases. In Copenhagen a hospital and a street are named after him.

Bergh was also an active malacologist, i.e. a zoologist who studies molluscs, in particular the nudibranchs, shell-less marine gastropods. He had well over 90 publications in this field and took part in a scientific expedition to Indonesia. He named and described numerous species of nudibranchs.

Biography 
Rudolph Bergh was born in Copenhagen. His father was chief physician in the army Ludvig Anton Berg (1793–1853). His mother was Anne Sophie Kirstine (maiden name Pedersen).  Bergh graduated from the Det von Westenske Institut in 1842, and received his medical degree in 1849.

Dr. Rudolph Bergh became an attending physician at what was then Almindeligt Hospital, the general hospital in Amaliegade, Copenhagen, in 1863. He worked in the department of skin diseases and venereal diseases. In 1886, he moved from there to Vestre Hospital, where he worked until 1903.

Bergh died in 1909. One year after his death, Vestre Hospital was renamed Rudolph Bergh Hospital in honor of his memory. At that hospital, anyone who wished to could be tested for sexually transmitted diseases, and get advice on safe sex and birth control without any change and while retaining their anonymity. In 2000, some of these functions were transferred to Bispebjerg Hospital.

There is a bust of Bergh in Copenhagen, in front of the eponymous "Rudolph Bergh's Hospital", on Tietgensgade. The bust was a gift from his colleagues and stood for years in his home. After his death Bergh's widow donated it to the hospital.

Bergh was awarded a knighthood of the Third Class Order (Ridder af Dannebrog) of Order of the Dannebrog and also the Dannebrogordenens Hæderstegn (Cross of Honour of the Order of the Dannebrog).

In Copenhagen there is a street named in honor of him: Rudolph Berghs Gade (in English: Rudolph Bergh's Street) in Ydre Østerbro.

His son Rudolph Sophus Bergh (September 22, 1859 - December 7, 1924) was a zoologist and a composer.

As a physician
His medical specialization was sexually transmitted diseases. Among the many texts that Rudolph Bergh wrote was About Tattoos in the public woman, which was published in the Hospital Journal in 1891. The work is about connections between prostitution, crime and tattoos. The article seems antiquated today and should not be taken as the sole expression of Rudolph Bergh great efforts to improve public health and in particular reduce the harmful effects of sexually transmitted diseases.

Bergh was also one of the editors of the hospital magazine Hospitalstidende, where he published nearly all of his over 50 medical articles.

  Bergh R. (1891). "Om Tatoveringer hos de offentlige Fruentimmer". (in English: About Tattoos in the public woman) Særtryk af "Hospitals-Tidende". Copenhagen.

As a zoologist
Bergh started to study molluscs when he was nearly 30, probably under the influence of Japetus Steenstrup, a Danish biologist who was 11 years older than he was and who was a professor of zoology at the University of Copenhagen.

He wrote reports of the Challenger expedition (1884) and the Albatross expedition (1894). He took part in the examination of species that were collected during the "Siboga Expedition".

Bergh became the world's leading expert on nudibranchs. He wrote his main malacological works as well as over 90 malacological articles and papers. Among other notable works are his work about the anatomy of the radula of the genus Conus (1896). His malacological drawing are considered to be "excellent". He was mainly anatomist and reached great progress in systematics based on anatomy of nervous system and of reproductive system of gastropods.   Bergh was very active in naming and describing species of nudibranchs and other sea slugs. The species he named include:
 Armina semperi (Bergh, 1861)
 Chromodoris annae Bergh, 1877
 Chromodoris dalli (Bergh, 1879) 
 Chromodoris elisabethina (Bergh, 1877)
 Chromodoris morchii Bergh, 1879 
 Chromodoris punctilucens Bergh, 1890 
 Thuridilla lineolata Bergh, 1905 
 Phyllodesmium briareum (Bergh, 1896)
 Phyllodesmium longicirrum (Bergh, 1905)

The nudibranch genus Berghia was named after him by Salvatore Trinchese in 1877.

His colleague and friend was German ethnologist and animal ecologist Carl Semper.

See also
 Paul Mayer (zoologist)
 Jean Paul Louis Pelseneer
 Mattheus Marinus Schepman
 Edgar Albert Smith

Bibliography
  Bergh R. (1858). Beiträge zur Kenntniss der Coniden. Nova Acta der Ksl. Leop.-Carol. Deutschen Akademie der Naturforschen, Halle. Band 65, number 2, 214 pp., 13 tables.
 Bergh R. (1870). Malacologische Untersuchungen. In: C.G. Semper, Reisen im Archipel der Philippinen, Wissenschaftliche Resultate. Band 2, Heft 1: 1-30, Pls. 1-8.
 Bergh L. S. R. (1877). Malacologische Untersuchungen. In: Reisen im Archipel der Philippinen von Dr. Carl Gottfried Semper. Zweiter Theil. Wissenschaftliche Resultate. Band 2, Theil 2, Heft 11, pp. 429–494, pls. 54-57.
 Bergh L. S. R. (1879). Neue Chromodoriden. Malakozool. Blatt, N. E 1 : 87-116; pt. 3 (31 March 1879) 
 Bergh L. S. R. (1879). On the nudibranchiate gasteropod Mollusca of the North Pacific Ocean, with special reference to those of Alaska. Part I. Proc. Acad. Nat Sci. Philadelphia 31: 71-132; pl. 1-8 (10 May 1879) 
 Bergh L. S. R. (1879). On the nudibranchiate gasteropod Mollusca of the North Pacific Ocean, with special reference to those of Alaska. Part 1. Sci. Results Explor. Alaska 1: 127-188; pl. 9-16 
 Bergh L. S. R. (1879). Gattungen nordische Doriden. Archiv für Naturgeschichte 45(1): 340-369, pl. 19.
 Bergh L. S. R. (1880). On the nudibranchiate gasteropod Mollusca of the North Pacific Ocean, with special reference to those of Alaska. Part 2. Sci. Results Explor. Alaska 2: 189-276; pl. 1-8 (10 May 1879) 
 Bergh, L. S. R.  (1881). Malacologische Untersuchungen.  In: Reisen im Archipel der Philippinen von Dr. Carl Gottfried Semper.  Zweiter Theil.  Wissenschaftliche Resultate.  Band 2, Theil 4, Heft 2, pp. 79–128, pls. G, H, J-L.
 Bergh, R. (1890). "Reports on the results of dredging, under the supervision of Alexander Agassiz, in the Gulf of Mexico (1877-78) and in the Caribbean Sea (1879-80), by the U. S. Coast Survey Steamer “Blake”, Lieut.-Commander C. D. Sigsbee, U.S.N., and Commander J. R. Bartlett, U.S.N., commanding. Report on the nudibranchs". Bulletin of the Museum of Comparative Zoology 19(3): 155-181, 3 pls.
 Bergh, L. S. R.  (1892).  Malacologische Untersuchungen.  In: Reisen im Archipel der Philippinen von Dr. Carl Gottfried Semper.  Zweiter Theil.  Wissenschaftliche Resultate.  Band 2, Theil 3, Heft 18, pp. 995–1165.
 Bergh, R. (1898). Die Opisthobranchier der Sammlung Plate. Zoologische Jahrbücher, Supplement 4(3): 481-582, pl. 28-33.
 Bergh, R. (1905). Die Opisthobranchia. Siboga Expedition Monograph 50: 1-248. Plates 1-20.
 Bergh, R. (1908). The Opisthobranchiata of South Africa. Marine investigations in South Africa. Cape Town. 5: 1-144. including 14 plates. (From the Transactions of the South African Philosophical Society 12.)

References
This article incorporates Creative Commons (CC-BY-SA) text from Danish Wikipedia from 5 January 2010.

Further reading 
 Petersen J. & Colin J. (1888). "Bergh, Ludvig Sophus Rudolf, f. 1824". Dansk Biografisk Leksikon, tillige omfattende Norge for tidsrummet 1537-1814, Kjøbenhavn. 2: 113-115.
 Dall W. H. (1909). "Ludwig Rudolph Sophus Bergh". Science 30(766): 304. 
 Vayssière A. (1910). "Nécrologie. Rudolph Bergh". Journal de Conchyliologie 58(1): 110-119. (include portrait and signature)
 Winckworth R. (1946). "On Bergh’s Malacologische Untersuchungen". Proceedings of the Malacological Society of London 27(1): 20-22.
 Burn R. (1978). "Publication dates of Bergh’s 1879 papers describing American chromodorids". The Veliger 20(3): 198-299.
 Jensen K. R. (2006). "The type collection of specimens described by Rudolf Bergh and housed in the Zoological Museum, Copenhagen". 72nd Annual Meeting of the American Malacological Society, Abstracts and Program: 52. (abstract)

External links

 A list of those of his publications which include Western Atlantic sea slugs

Danish venereologists
Danish malacologists

1824 births
1909 deaths